George William Samuel Abbey (born August 21, 1932) is a former director of the Johnson Space Center (JSC) and Fellow in Space Policy at the Baker Institute of Rice University.

Biography
Abbey was born in Seattle, Washington in 1932 to Sam and Brenta Abbey. His father was born in London but had emigrated to Canada, returning to Europe to serve in the First World War. After being injured in France, Sam returned to London to recuperate where he met Bridget, later changing her name to Brenta, who had moved to the capital from the village of Laugharne in Wales. Sam and Bridget married and their first child, a boy, was born in Wales before the couple moved to Canada before settling in Seattle. Abbey attended Lincoln High School there. He  received his bachelor's degree in general science from the United States Naval Academy in (Annapolis, Maryland) in 1954; and a master's degree in electrical engineering from the U.S. Air Force Institute of Technology at Wright-Patterson Air Force Base, Ohio, in 1959.

A pilot in the U.S. Air Force, Abbey had more than 4,000 hours in various types of aircraft before being detailed to NASA. 
While in the Air Force, he served in the Air Force Research and Development Command and was involved in the early Air Force manned space activities, including the Dyna-Soar Program.
Abbey joined NASA in 1964 as an Air Force captain assigned to the Apollo program. 
In December 1967 he left the Air Force and was named technical assistant to the Johnson Space Center director.

In January 1976, he was named director of flight operations, where he was responsible for operational planning and for the overall direction and management of flight crew and flight control activities for all human spaceflight missions.

In 1983, he became director of the Flight Crew Operations Directorate, where he continued to be responsible for all Space Shuttle flight crews and JSC aircraft operations. 
Abbey would select the crews that flew during the early years of the Space Shuttle. As director of flight operations, he put America’s first woman in space when he assigned Sally Ride to the crew of 1983′s STS-7. 
Abbey was appointed deputy associate administrator for space flight at NASA Headquarters in Washington, D.C. in March 1988.

In July 1990, he was selected as deputy for operations and senior NASA representative to the Synthesis Group, charged with defining strategies for returning to the Moon and landing on Mars.

In July 1991, Abbey was appointed senior director for civil space policy for the National Space Council in the Executive Office of the President. President George H. W. Bush reestablished, by executive order, the National Space Council, led by Vice President Dan Quayle. Part of its job was to find a direction for America’s space initiatives in a time when the nation would no longer be engaged in a technology race with the Soviet Union. The Council began to see several unique opportunities for engaging the former Soviet Union in a space station program.

In 1992, he was named special assistant to the NASA administrator. In 1994 Abbey was named deputy director of the Johnson Space Center and was subsequently selected as the JSC director in 1996.

As director of Johnson Space Center until 2001, he served as an integral part of the NASA Shuttle-Mir Program and provided crucial oversight, management, and guidance in the first phase of the International Space Station.

Abbey was opposed to the proposed Space Station Freedom because of the large cost and impracticality of the station. A small team of administrators and scientists including Abbey, John Young, Thomas P. Stafford and Max Faget were called to devise a cheaper alternative to Freedom. This team proposed a new modular space station in April 1993. He helped later enlist partner nations to share the adventure — and the costs — of implementing those plans for a permanent outpost in Earth orbit.

Honors

In 2002, Abbey was selected as a distinguished alumnus of the U.S. Air Force Institute of Technology.

His honors and awards include the NASA Exceptional Service Medal, the NASA Outstanding Leadership Medal, three NASA Distinguished Service Medals and the 1970 Presidential Medal of Freedom, presented by President Richard M. Nixon for his distinguished civilian service in peacetime.
 
In addition, he was the recipient of the Rotary National Award for Space Achievement's National Space Trophy in 1997.

In 1998 he was awarded the Robert R. Gilruth Award in recognition of his accomplishments and dedication to human spaceflight.

In 2007 a special category was included for the Sir Arthur Clarke Award which was presented by and named after Abbey.

Publications 
Transcript: "Lost in Space: The Need for a Definitive U.S. Space Policy,  Jan 27 2014

U.S. - Russia Space Policy, Sept 13 2013

Spotlight on the U.S. Space Program: Problems and Solutions, Mar 08 2013

Time for the U.S. to Partner With China in Space?, Nov 27 2012

Return to Reality: Why a Space Shuttle Program Is Vital to the Survival of the International Space Station, Oct 26 2011

Restore the Vision, Jul 20 2011

International Space Medicine Summit III Executive Summary, Feb 16 2010
        
United States Space Policy: Challenges and Opportunities Gone Astray, Jul 28 2009
     
Congressional Briefing for United States Space Policy: Challenges and Opportunities Gone Astray, Jun 30 2009
       
Maximizing NASA's Potential in Flight and on the Ground: Recommendations for the Next Administration, Jan 20 2009
        
Video Briefing Transcript: Public Policy for the Public - Science and Technology, Dec 05 2007
        
Nuclear Nonproliferation: Policy Implications, Nov 02 2007
        
United States Space Policy: Challenges and Opportunities, Aug 31 2005

References

"Johnson Space Center Research and Technology Annual Report" (2004) NASA Technical Report Server
Chaikin, Andrew "George Abbey: NASA"s Most Controversial Figure" (2001), Space Illustrated
NASA History Program Office

External links

Former BBC space correspondent Reg Turnill interviews Abbey in 2008

1932 births
Living people
NASA people
People from Seattle
Presidential Medal of Freedom recipients
Air Force Institute of Technology alumni
American people of English descent